The 2022 New England Revolution II season is the third season in the soccer team's history, where they compete in the third division of American soccer, MLS Next Pro. New England Revolution II, as a child club of New England Revolution of Major League Soccer, are barred from participating in the 2022 U.S. Open Cup. New England Revolution II play their home games at Gillette Stadium, located in Foxborough, Massachusetts, United States.

Club

Roster 
As of March 28, 2022.
Revs II sign Four Players

+ On loan from first team

Academy Roster

Coaching staff

Competitions

Exhibitions

MLS NEXT Pro

Standings 
Eastern Conference

Overall table

Results summary

Results by round

Match results

Statistics

Top scorers 
{| class="wikitable" style="font-size: 100%; text-align: center;"
|-
! style="background:#0C2340; color:#FFFFFF; border:2px solid #C8102E; width:35px;" scope="col"|Rank
! style="background:#0C2340; color:#FFFFFF; border:2px solid #C8102E; width:35px;" scope="col"|Position
! style="background:#0C2340; color:#FFFFFF; border:2px solid #C8102E; width:35px;" scope="col"|No.
! style="background:#0C2340; color:#FFFFFF; border:2px solid #C8102E; width:140px;" scope="col"|Name
! style="background:#0C2340; color:#FFFFFF; border:2px solid #C8102E; width:75px;" scope="col"|
|-
|1||FW||39|| Marcos Dias||6
|-
|2||FW||99|| Ryan Lima||4
|-
|3||MF||72|| Damian Rivera||3 
|-
|4||MF ||54|| Jack Panayotou||2
|-
|4||MF||48|| Michel||2 
|-
|4||FW||36|| Meny Silva||2
|-
|4||DF||44|| Pierre Cayet||2 
|-
|8||DF||40|| Sean O'Hearn||1 
|-
|8||MF||29|| Noel Buck||1
|-
|8||DF||41|| Colby Quiñones||1 
|-
|8||FW||89|| Malcolm Fry||1
|-
|8||DF||52|| Italo||1 
|-
!colspan="4"|Total
!26

References

External links

New England Revolution II
New England Revolution II
New England Revolution II
New England Revolution II